"Man Smart (Woman Smarter)" is a calypso song variously credited as being composed by Norman Span (King Radio), D. L. Miller, F. Kuhn, and Charles Harris. Span's authorship seems most likely since, as a popular calypso musician and songwriter, he first recorded the song in 1936, and none of the other ascribed composers are associated with calypso. Miller's music industry career began around 1950.

Artists from many genres, including Joan Baez, Harry Belafonte, the Carpenters, Rosanne Cash, Chubby Checker, Dr Victor, Robert Palmer,  and Ratdog, have recorded the song. It was a staple of the live repertoire of the Grateful Dead from 1981 to 1995. Belafonte's first of three recordings of the song was included on his best-selling album Calypso, which reached number one on the Billboard Top Pop Albums chart in 1956, and remained on the chart for 31 weeks. Span is credited as the song's composer on Belafonte's albums. It is sung by Desi Arnaz, Lucille Ball, William Frawley and Vivian Vance in the 1957 episode of I Love Lucy entitled "Ragtime Band". A brief clip of a recording of Homer and Marge Simpson singing it was also shown in The Simpsons' 1991 episode Treehouse of Horror II as well.

References

1936 songs
Calypso songs
Harry Belafonte songs
The Carpenters songs
Rosanne Cash songs
Chubby Checker songs
Grateful Dead songs